Cataclysta is a genus of moths described by Jacob Hübner in 1825.

Species
 Cataclysta aclistalis Dyar, 1914
 Cataclysta albifulvalis Marion, 1956
 Cataclysta albipunctalis Hampson, 1897
 Cataclysta ambahonalis (Marion, 1954)
 Cataclysta amboinalis Hampson, 1917
 Cataclysta angulata Moore, 1885
 Cataclysta confusalis Marion, 1956
 Cataclysta hexalitha Meyrick, 1886
 Cataclysta lampetialis Walker, 1859
 Cataclysta lemnata (Linnaeus, 1758)
 Cataclysta marginipuncta Turner, 1937
 Cataclysta melanolitha (Turner, 1908)
 Cataclysta ochrealis Marion, 1956
 Cataclysta pleonaxalis (Hampson, 1897)
 Cataclysta polyrrapha Turner, 1937
 Cataclysta polystictalis (Hampson, 1906)
 Cataclysta psathyrodes Turner, 1908
 Cataclysta pusillalis Saalmüller, 1880
 Cataclysta quintula (Meyrick, 1938)
 Cataclysta seriopunctalis (Hampson, 1897)
 Cataclysta suffuscalis Marion, 1956
 Cataclysta supercilialis Hampson, 1897

Former species
 Cataclysta argyrochrysalis Mabille, 1900 
 Cataclysta callichromalis Mabille, 1879 
 Cataclysta cyanolitha Meyrick, 1886
 Cataclysta diehlalis Marion, 1956
 Cataclysta leroii Strand, 1915
 Cataclysta nyasalis Hampson, 1917
 Cataclysta perirrorata Hampson, 1917

References

External links
Genus Cataclysta

Acentropinae
Crambidae genera
Taxa named by Jacob Hübner